Sardar Bhagwant Singh Bangeshwar (Sarkar-i-Bangash-O-Amir-i-Umara-i-Azam)  was an Indian ruler of the Bangash (in present-day Pakhtunkhwa) of the 18th century. He was a cousin of Bhai Mani Singh.

Titles
"Bangeshwar" or " Bangash-Pati " are the titles he was known with from the name of the state he ruled the Bangash in the Kurram Valley. Kurram, at the time was a Pashtun state extending from the Indus River to Kurram River in present-day Pakistan.

With Aurangzeb

Two centuries after 1500, Rajput rulers began to take high positions in Mughal court. Apart from being a ruler he was a fierce warrior too, which led Aurangzeb to give him 1000 cavalry and 4000 infantry and gave him the title of Umar-i-Azam which was high mansab given to Rajput rulers.

Battle with Kamal Khan

He was engaged in a battle with Kamal Khan, who was Mughal commander of Attock Fort. He killed Kamal Khan in a fierce battle and made the Mughals fear his might.

Meeting Guru Gobind Singh

Guru Gobind Singh had to settle in Nanded after being attacked by Mughals. All his sons were martyred. Sardar Bhagwant Singh went to meet Guru Gobind Singh to discuss his sorrow. After hearing all the atrocities done on the Guru by the Mughals he pledged to ruin the tyrant of Sirhind who killed innocent younger sons of the Guru.

Attack on Sirhind and killing of Wazir Khan

Wazir khan ( Sarkar-i-Sirhind )  was a Mansabdar with 2000 horsemen under Aurangzeb which was much less as compared to a Mansab of 5000 horsemen of Sardar Bhagwant Singh ( Sarkar-i-Bangash ), so Wazir Khan's defeat was certain. Sardar Bhagwant Singh along with his seven brothers and Banda Singh Bahadur(whom Guru Gobind Singh sent with them acknowledging him as the Guru's adopted son) made his sword bathe in tyrant's blood and ruined the Mughal rule in Sirhind which was a very big Mughal subah extending from Sutlej to Yamuna. His one brother Sardar Baj Singh (first Governor of Khalsa Raj) was made governor of Sirhind and one more of his brothers, Sardar Ram Singh was made governor of Thanesar. He kept his word given to the Guru.

References

18th-century Indian people
Mughal Empire people